Fort Garry-Riverview was a provincial electoral division in the Canadian province of Manitoba. It was created by the decennial electoral redistribution in 2008, out of parts of Lord Roberts and Fort Garry. It was in south-central Winnipeg.

It bordered the ridings of Fort Richmond, St. Norbert, Riel, St. Vital, St. Boniface, Fort Rouge, River Heights, and Fort Whyte. The riding's population in 2006 was 20,365.

Fort Garry-Riverview was eliminated by redistribution in 2018 and its territory went to parts of the re-created Fort Garry and Fort Rouge.

List of provincial representatives

Electoral results

2011 general election

2016 general election

References

Former provincial electoral districts of Manitoba
Politics of Winnipeg
Fort Garry, Winnipeg